Events in the year 1994 in Portugal.

Incumbents
President: Mário Soares
Prime Minister: Aníbal Cavaco Silva

Events
 12 June - European Parliament election.
December 9 O Estranho Mundo de Jack on Portuguese Movie Theater

Arts and entertainment

Portugal participated in the Eurovision Song Contest 1994 with Sara Tavares and the song "Chamar a música".

Sports
Portugal participated in the 1994 Winter Olympics. In association football, for the first-tier league seasons, see 1993–94 Primeira Divisão and 1994–95 Primeira Divisão; for the cup seasons, see 1993–94 Taça de Portugal and 1994–95 Taça de Portugal.
 3–12 June - European Men's Handball Championship
 5 June - Taça de Portugal Final
 20–24 July - World Junior Championships in Athletics
 25 September - Portuguese Grand Prix
 7–9 October - Trampoline World Championships

Births
 14 February - Diogo Carvalho, swimmer
 27 May - João Cancelo, footballer 
 24 October - Bruma, footballer

Deaths
 7 February - Jorge Brum do Canto, film director, actor

References

 
Portugal
Years of the 20th century in Portugal
Portugal